Hokejsko drsalno društvo Jesenice or simply HDD Jesenice, currently named SIJ Acroni Jesenice due to sponsorship reasons, is a Slovenian ice hockey team based in Jesenice. They are members of the Alps Hockey League and the Slovenian Ice Hockey League. HDD Jesenice was founded in 2014. The club replaced a temporary team called Team Jesenice, which was established in 2013. HDD Jesenice previously competed in the Inter-National League from 2014 to 2016, before the league merged into the Alps Hockey League. The club won their first Slovenian Championship in the 2014–15 season and as a result qualified for the 2015–16 IIHF Continental Cup. Their home arena is Podmežakla Hall.

History
HDD Jesenice was founded in 2014 and joined the Inter-National League (INL) and the Slovenian Ice Hockey League for the 2014–15 season. The team replaced a temporary team called Team Jesenice, which was founded in 2013 as a successor of HK Acroni Jesenice, a team that was dissolved in 2012 due to financial debt. Team Jesenice was operated by the Ice Hockey Federation of Slovenia during the 2013–14 season, and is not regarded as the same team as HDD Jesenice. In their first Inter-National League season, HDD Jesenice finished the regular season in third place. Going into the playoffs Jesenice was drawn against Slavija for the quarterfinals. They defeated Slavija in four games and advanced to the semifinals against VEU Feldkirch. Jesenice lost the semifinal series in four games. In their first Slovenian Championship season Jesenice finished the regular season in second place, three points behind Olimpija. Following their second-place finish Jesenice advanced straight to the semifinals where they were drawn against the third-placed Triglav Kranj. Jesenice won in two games and progressed to the final against Olimpija. Jesenice won the finals three games to one, winning their first Slovenian Championship title. As a result of winning the 2014–15 Slovenian Championship Jesenice qualified for the 2015–16 IIHF Continental Cup where they entered in the second round. Jesenice was drawn in Group B of the second round against CH Jaca, Miskolci Jegesmedve and Mogo Riga. Jesenice finished the round-robin Group B tournament in third place and failed to qualify for the third round of the tournament. In the same season, Jesenice also competed in the inaugural season of the Slovenian Cup, where they lost in the final against Olimpija.

Jesenice finished the 2015–16 INL regular season in third place, 19 points behind the first-placed VEU Feldkirch. The team advanced to the playoffs where they were drawn against the second-placed EHC Lustenau in the semifinals. Lustenau went on to defeat Jesenice in three games. In the 2015–16 Slovenian Championship season Jesenice finished first in the standings with nine wins from ten games. In the playoffs Jesenice advanced to the finals after defeating Maribor in the quarterfinals and Celje in the semifinals. Jesenice went on to lose the final to Olimpija after five games. In June 2016 the Inter-National League was merged with the Italian Serie A to form the Alps Hockey League (AHL). HDD Jesenice applied as the only Slovenian member and was accepted into the 16-team league.

In the 2016–17 season, Jesenice won their second national title after defeating Olimpija 3–0 in the finals.

Season-by-season record

Other tournaments
2015–16 IIHF Continental Cup: 3rd in Group B (second round)
2015–16 Slovenian Cup: Runners-up
2016–17 IIHF Continental Cup: 3rd in Group C (second round)
2017–18 Slovenian Cup: Winners
2018–19 Slovenian Cup: Runners-up
2018–19 IIHF Continental Cup: 2nd in Group B (second round)
2019–20 Slovenian Cup: Runners-up
2020–21 Slovenian Cup: Winners
2021–22 Slovenian Cup: Runners-up
2021–22 IIHF Continental Cup: 3rd in Group D (second round)
2022–23 Slovenian Cup: Runners-up
2022–23 IIHF Continental Cup: 3rd in Group E (third round)

Players and personnel

Current roster
As of 3 February 2023

Head coaches
Gorazd Rekelj, 2014
Roman Pristov, 2014–2015
Nik Zupančič, 2015
Dejan Varl, 2015–2016
Nik Zupančič, 2016–2017
Gaber Glavič, 2017–2018
Marcel Rodman, 2018–2019
Mitja Šivic, 2019–2021
Nik Zupančič, 2021–2022
Gaber Glavič, 2022–present

Notes
a: Matches between Slovenian teams in the Inter-National League and Alps Hockey League counted for the national championship as well.
b: Jesenice joined the competition for the playoffs only.

References

External links
Official website 

2014 establishments in Slovenia
Ice hockey clubs established in 2014
Inter-National League teams
Sport in Jesenice, Jesenice
Slovenian Ice Hockey League teams
Ice hockey teams in Slovenia